Each winner of the 1987 Governor General's Awards for Literary Merit received $5000 and a medal from the Governor General of Canada.  The winners and nominees were selected by a panel of judges administered by the Canada Council for the Arts.

The Governor General's Awards for Literary Merit nominally increased in number from 8 in 1986 to 14 in 1987, with the addition of four awards for children's book writing and illustration and two awards for translation. The four Children's Literature awards, however, were simply the four annual Canada Council Children's Literature Prizes (1975 to 1986) under a new name.

English

French

References

Governor General's Awards
Governor General's Awards
Governor General's Awards